The Rashidun Caliphate (632  661) was the first caliphate to succeed the Islamic prophet Muhammad. It was ruled by the first four successive caliphs of Muhammad after his death in 632 CE (11 AH). During its existence, the empire was the most powerful economic, cultural, and military force in West Asia.

The caliphate arose following Muhammad’s passing in June 632 and the subsequent debate over the succession to his leadership. Muhammad's close companion Abu Bakr, of the Banu Taym clan, was elected the first caliph in Medina and he began the conquest of the Arabian Peninsula. His brief reign ended in August 634 when he died and was succeeded by Umar, his appointed successor from the Banu Adi clan. Under Umar, the caliphate expanded at an unprecedented rate, ruling more than two-thirds of the Byzantine Empire and nearly the entire Sasanian Empire. Umar was assassinated in November 644 and was succeeded by Uthman, a member of the Banu Umayya clan, who was elected by a six-person committee arranged by Umar. Under Uthman, the caliphate concluded its conquest of Persia in 651 and continued expeditions into the Byzantine territories. Uthman's nepotistic policies earned him vehement opposition from some Muslim generals and he was eventually assassinated by rebels in June 656.

He was subsequently succeeded by Ali, a member of Muhammad's Banu Hashim clan, who transferred the capital to Kufa. Ali presided over the civil war called the First Fitna as his suzerainty was unrecognized by Uthman's kinsman and Syria's governor Mu'awiya I, who believed that Uthman was unlawfully killed and his murderers should be punished. Additionally, a third faction known as Kharijites, who were former supporters of Ali, rebelled against both Ali and Mu'awiya after refusing to accept the arbitration in the Battle of Siffin. The war led to the overthrow of the Rashidun Caliphate and the establishment of the Umayyad Caliphate in 661 by Mu'awiya. The civil war permanently consolidated the divide between Sunni and Shia Muslims, with Shia Muslims believing Ali to be the first rightful caliph and Imam after Muhammad, favouring his bloodline connection to Muhammad.

The Rashidun Caliphate is characterized by a twenty-five-year period of rapid military expansion followed by a five-year period of internal strife. The Rashidun Army numbered more than 100,000 men at its peak. By the 650s, in addition to the Arabian Peninsula, the caliphate had subjugated the Levant to the Transcaucasus in the north; North Africa from Egypt to present-day Tunisia in the west; and the Iranian Plateau to parts of Central Asia and South Asia in the east. The four Rashidun caliphs were chosen by a small electoral body consisting of prominent members of the Quraysh tribal confederation called .

Origin

After Muhammad's death in 632 CE, his Medinan companions debated which of them should succeed him in running the affairs of the Muslims while Muhammad's household was busy with his burial. Umar and Abu Ubayda ibn al-Jarrah pledged their loyalty to Abu Bakr, with the Ansar and the Quraysh soon following suit. Abu Bakr adopted the title of Khalīfaṫ Rasūl Allāh ("Successor of the Messenger of God") or simply caliph. Abu Bakr embarked on campaigns to propagate Islam. First he would have to subdue the Arabian tribes, which had claimed that although they pledged allegiance to Muhammad and accepted Islam, they owed nothing to Abu Bakr. As a caliph, Abu Bakr was not a monarch and never claimed such a title; nor did any of his three successors. Rather, their election and leadership were based upon merit.

Notably, according to Sunnis, all four Rashidun Caliphs were connected to Muhammad through marriage, were early converts to Islam, were among ten who were explicitly promised paradise, were his closest companions by association and support and were often highly praised by Muhammad and delegated roles of leadership within the nascent Muslim community. These caliphs are collectively known in Sunni Islam as the Rashidun, or "Rightly Guided" caliphs. According to Sunni Muslims, the term Rashidun Caliphate is derived from a famous hadith of Muhammad, where he foretold that the caliphate after him would last for 30 years (the length of the Rashidun Caliphate) and would then be followed by kingship (the Umayyad Caliphate was a hereditary monarchy). Furthermore, according to other hadiths in Sunan Abu Dawood and Musnad Ahmad ibn Hanbal, towards the end times, the Rightly Guided Caliphate will be restored once again by God. However, this term is not used in Shia Islam, as most Shia Muslims do not consider the rule of the first three caliphs legitimate. On the other hand, the Zaydi Shia Muslims believe the first three caliphs to be legitimate leaders.

History

Abu Bakr's reign (632–634)

Accession to Caliphate 
After Muhammad's death in June 632, a gathering of the Ansar, the natives of Medina, took place in the Saqifah (courtyard) of the Banu Sa'ida clan. The general belief at the time was that the purpose of the meeting was for the Ansar to decide on a new leader of the Muslim community among themselves, with the intentional exclusion of the Muhajirun (migrants from Mecca), though this has later become the subject of debate.

Nevertheless, Abu Bakr and Umar, both prominent companions of Muhammad, upon learning of the meeting became concerned about a potential coup and hastened to the gathering. Upon arriving, Abu Bakr addressed the assembled men with a warning that any attempt to elect a leader outside of Muhammad's own tribe, the Quraysh, would likely result in dissension as only they can command the necessary respect among the community. He then took Umar and another companion, Abu Ubaidah ibn al-Jarrah, by the hand and offered them to the Ansar as potential choices. He was countered with the suggestion that the Quraysh and the Ansar choose a leader each from among themselves, who would then rule jointly. The group grew heated upon hearing this proposal and began to argue amongst themselves. Umar hastily took Abu Bakr's hand and swore his own allegiance to the latter, an example followed by the gathered men.

Abu Bakr was near-universally accepted as head of the Muslim community (under the title of Caliph) as a result of Saqifah, though he did face contention as a result of the rushed nature of the event. Several companions, most prominent among them being Ali ibn Abi Talib, initially refused to acknowledge his authority. Ali may have been reasonably expected to assume leadership, being both cousin and son-in-law to Muhammad. The theologian Ibrahim al-Nakha'i stated that Ali also had support among the Ansar for his succession, explained by the genealogical links he shared with them. Whether his candidacy for the succession was raised during Saqifah is unknown, though it is not unlikely. Abu Bakr later sent Umar to confront Ali to gain his allegiance, resulting in an altercation which may have involved violence. However, after six months the group made peace with Abu Bakr and Ali offered him his fealty.

Conquest of Arabia 
Troubles emerged soon after Muhammad's death, threatening the unity and stability of the new community and state. Apostasy spread to every tribe in the Arabian Peninsula with the exception of the people in Mecca and Medina, the Banu Thaqif in Ta'if and the Bani Abdul Qais of Oman. In some cases, entire tribes apostatized. Others merely withheld zakat, the alms tax, without formally challenging Islam. Many tribal leaders made claims to prophethood; some made it during the lifetime of Muhammad. The first incident of apostasy was fought and concluded while Muhammad still lived; a supposed prophet Aswad Ansi arose and invaded South Arabia; he was killed on 30 May 632 (6 Rabi' al-Awwal, 11 Hijri) by Governor Fērōz of Yemen, a Persian Muslim. The news of his death reached Medina shortly after the death of Muhammad. The apostasy of al-Yamama was led by another supposed prophet, Musaylimah, who arose before Muhammad's death; other centers of the rebels were in the Najd, Eastern Arabia (known then as al-Bahrayn) and South Arabia (known as al-Yaman and including the Mahra). Many tribes claimed that they had submitted to Muhammad and that with Muhammad's death, their allegiance was ended. Caliph Abu Bakr insisted that they had not just submitted to a leader but joined an ummah (community) of which he was the new head. The result of this situation was the Ridda wars.

Abu Bakr planned his strategy accordingly. He divided the Muslim army into several corps. The strongest corps, and the primary force of the Muslims, was the corps of Khalid ibn al-Walid. This corps was used to fight the most powerful of the rebel forces. Other corps were given areas of secondary importance in which to bring the less dangerous apostate tribes to submission. Abu Bakr's plan was first to clear Najd and Western Arabia near Medina, then tackle Malik ibn Nuwayrah and his forces between the Najd and al-Bahrayn, and finally concentrate against the most dangerous enemy, Musaylimah and his allies in al-Yamama. After a series of successful campaigns Khalid ibn al-Walid defeated Musaylimah in the Battle of Yamama. The Campaign on the Apostasy was fought and completed during the eleventh year of the Hijri. The year 12 Hijri dawned on 18 March 633 with the Arabian peninsula united under the caliph in Medina.

Expeditions to Persia and Syria 
After Abu Bakr unified Arabia under Islam, he began the incursions into the Byzantine Empire and the Sasanian Empire. Whether or not he intended a full-out imperial conquest is hard to say; he did, however, set in motion a historical trajectory that in just a few short decades would lead to one of the largest empires in history. Abu Bakr began with Iraq, the richest province of the Sasanian Empire. He sent general Khalid ibn al-Walid to invade the Sassanian Empire in 633. He thereafter also sent four armies to invade the Roman province of Syria, but the decisive operation was only undertaken when Khalid, after completing the conquest of Iraq, was transferred to the Syrian front in 634.

Umar's reign (634–644) 
Before dying in August 634 from an illness, Abu Bakr appointed Umar as his successor. Upon his accession, Umar adopted the title , which later became the standard title of caliphs. The new caliph continued the war of conquests begun by his predecessor, pushing further into the Sassanian Empire, north into Byzantine territory, and went into Egypt. These were regions of great wealth controlled by powerful states, but the long conflict between Byzantines and Persians had left both sides militarily exhausted, and the Islamic armies easily prevailed against them. By 640, they had brought all of Mesopotamia, Syria and Palestine under the control of the Rashidun Caliphate; Egypt was conquered by 642, and the entire Sassanian Empire by 643.

While the caliphate continued its rapid expansion, Umar laid the foundations of a political structure that could hold it together. He created the Diwan, a bureau for transacting government affairs. The military was brought directly under state control and into its pay. Crucially, in conquered lands, Umar did not require that non-Muslim populations convert to Islam, nor did he try to centralize government. Instead, he allowed subject populations to retain their religion, language, and customs, and he left their government relatively untouched, imposing only a governor (amir) and a financial officer called an amil. These new posts were integral to the efficient network of taxation that financed the empire.

With the bounty secured from conquest, Umar was able to support its faith in material ways: the companions of Muhammad were given pensions on which to live, allowing them to pursue religious studies and exercise spiritual leadership in their communities and beyond. Umar is also remembered for establishing the Islamic calendar; it is lunar-like the Arabian calendar, but the origin is set in 622, the year of the Hijra when Muhammad emigrated to Medina.

While Umar was leading the morning prayers in 644, he was assassinated by the Persian slave Abu Lu'lu'a Firuz. He appointed Suhayb ibn Sinan to lead the prayers.

Uthman's reign (644–656)

Election of Uthman 

Before Umar died, he appointed a committee of six men to decide on the next caliph and charged them with choosing one of their own numbers. All of the men, like Umar, were from the tribe of Quraysh.

The committee narrowed down the choices to two: Uthman and Ali. Ali was from the Banu Hashim clan (the same clan as Muhammad) of the Quraish tribe, and he was the cousin and son-in-law of Muhammad and had been one of his companions from the inception of his mission. Uthman was from the Umayyad clan of the Quraish. He was the second cousin and son-in-law of Muhammad and one of the early converts of Islam. Uthman was ultimately chosen.

Uthman reigned for twelve years as a caliph. During the first half of his reign, he was the most popular caliph among all the Rashiduns, while in the latter half of his reign he met increasing opposition, led by the Egyptians and concentrated around Ali, who would albeit briefly, succeed Uthman as caliph.

Despite internal troubles, Uthman continued the wars of conquest started by Umar. The Rashidun army conquered North Africa from the Byzantines and even raided Spain, conquering the coastal areas of the Iberian Peninsula, as well as the islands of Rhodes and Cyprus. Also, coastal Sicily was raided in 652. The Rashidun army fully conquered the Sasanian Empire, and its eastern frontiers extended up to the lower Indus River.

Uthman's most lasting project was the final compilation of the Qur'an. Under his authority diacritics were written with Arabic letters so that non-native speakers of Arabic could easily read the Qur'an.

Siege of Uthman 

After a protest turned into a siege on his house, Uthman refused to initiate any military action, in order to avoid civil war between Muslims and preferred to negotiate a peaceful solution. After the negotiations, the protesters returned but found a man following them, holding an order to execute them, at which point, the protesters returned to Uthman's home, bearing the order. Uthman swore that he did not write the order and to talk the protesters down. The protesters responded by demanding he step down as caliph. Uthman refused and returned to his room, whereupon the protesters broke into Uthman's house and killed him while he was reading the Qur'an. It was later discovered that the order to kill the rebels did not, in fact, originate from Uthman, but was, rather, part of a conspiracy to overthrow him. In June 656, a group of rebels climbed from the back of Uthman's house and murdered the caliph.

Ali's reign (656–661)

Crisis and fragmentation 

Following Uthman's assassination, Muhammad's cousin Ali was elected caliph by the rebels and townspeople of Medina. He transferred the capital to Kufa, a garrison city in Iraq. Soon thereafter, Ali dismissed several provincial governors, some of whom were relatives of Uthman, and replaced them with trusted aides, such as Malik al-Ashtar and Salman the Persian.

Demands to take revenge for the assassination of Caliph Uthman rose among parts of the population, and a large army of rebels led by Zubayr, Talha and the widow of Muhammad, Aisha, set out to fight the perpetrators. The army reached Basra and captured it, whereupon 4,000 suspected seditionists were put to death. Subsequently, Ali turned towards Basra and the caliph's army met the rebel army. Though neither Ali nor the leaders of the opposing force, Talha and Zubayr, wanted to fight, a battle broke out at night between the two armies. It is said, according to Sunni Muslim traditions, that those who were involved in the assassination of Uthman initiated combat, as they were afraid that negotiations between Ali and the opposing army would result in their capture and execution. The battle thus fought was the first battle between Muslims and is known as the Battle of the Camel. Ali emerged victoriously and the dispute was settled. The eminent companions of Muhammad, Talha, and Zubayr, were killed in the battle and Ali sent his son Hasan ibn Ali to escort Aisha back to Medina.

Thereafter, there rose another cry for revenge for the blood of Uthman, this time by Mu'awiya, a kinsman of Uthman and governor of the province of Syria. However, it is regarded more as an attempt by Mu'awiya to assume the caliphate, rather than to take revenge for Uthman's murder. Ali fought Mu'awiya's forces to a stalemate at the Battle of Siffin, and then lost a controversial arbitration that ended with the arbiter, 'Amr ibn al-'As, pronouncing his support for Mu'awiya. After this Ali was forced to fight the Battle of Nahrawan against the rebellious Kharijites, a faction of his former supporters who, as a result of their dissatisfaction with the arbitration, opposed both Ali and Mu'awiya. Weakened by this internal rebellion and a lack of popular support in many provinces, Ali's forces lost control over most of the caliphate's territory to Mu'awiya while large sections of the empire—such as Sicily, North Africa, the coastal areas of Spain and some forts in Anatolia—were also lost to outside empires.

In 661, Ali was assassinated by Ibn Muljam as part of a Kharijite plot to assassinate all the different Islamic leaders in an attempt to end the civil war, but the Kharijites failed to assassinate Mu'awiya and 'Amr ibn al-'As.

Ali's son Hasan ibn Ali, the grandson of Muhammad, briefly assumed the caliphate and came to an agreement with Mu'awiya to fix relations between the two groups of Muslims that were each loyal to one of the two men. The treaty stated that Mu'awiya would not name a successor during his reign, and that he would let the Islamic world choose the next leader (this treaty would later be broken by Mu'awiya as he named his son Yazid I successor). Hasan was assassinated, and Mu'awiya founded the Umayyad Caliphate, supplanting the Rashidun Caliphate.

Military expansion
The Rashidun Caliphate expanded steadily; within the span of 24 years, a vast territory was conquered comprising Mesopotamia, the Levant, parts of Anatolia, and most of the Sasanian Empire.

Unlike the Sasanian Persians, the Byzantines, after losing Syria, retreated back to Anatolia. As a result, they also lost Egypt to the invading Rashidun army, although the civil wars among the Muslims halted the war of conquest for many years, and this gave time for the Byzantine Empire to recover.

Conquest of the Sasanian Empire

The first Islamic invasion of the Sasanian Empire, launched by Caliph Abu Bakr in 633, was a swift conquest, taking only four months. Abu Bakr sent his general, Khalid ibn al-Walid, to conquer Mesopotamia after the Ridda wars. After entering Iraq with his army of 18,000, Khalid won decisive victories in four consecutive battles: the Battle of Chains, fought in April 633; the Battle of River, fought in the third week of April 633; the Battle of Walaja, fought in May 633 (where he successfully used a pincer movement), and the Battle of Ullais, fought in mid-May of 633. In the last week of May 633, the capital city of Iraq fell to the Muslims after initial resistance in the Battle of Hira.

After resting his armies, Khalid moved in June 633 towards Anbar, which resisted and was defeated, and eventually surrendered after a siege of a few weeks in July 633. Khalid then moved towards the south, and conquered the city of Ein ul Tamr in the last week of July 633. By now, almost the whole of Iraq was under Islamic control. Khalid received a call for help from Daumat-ul-jandal in Northern Arabia, where another Muslim general, Iyad ibn Ghanm, was trapped among the rebel tribes. Khalid diverted there and defeated the rebels in the Battle of Daumat-ul-jandal in the last week of August 633. Returning from Arabia, he received news that a large Persian army was assembling. Within a few weeks, he decided to defeat them piecemeal in order to avoid the risk of defeat by a large unified Persian army. Four divisions of Persian and Christian Arab auxiliaries were present at Hanafiz, Zumiel, Sanni, and Muzieh.

In November 633, Khalid divided his army into three units, and attacked these auxiliaries one by one from three different sides at night, starting with the Battle of Muzieh, then the Battle of Sanni, and finally the Battle of Zumail. These devastating defeats ended Persian control over Iraq. In December 633, Khalid reached the border city of Firaz, where he defeated the combined forces of the Sasanian Persians, Byzantines and Christian Arabs in the Battle of Firaz. This was the last battle in his conquest of Iraq.

Khalid then left Mesopotamia to lead another campaign in Syria against the Byzantine Empire, after which Mithna ibn Haris took command in Mesopotamia. The Persians once again concentrated armies to regain Mesopotamia, while Mithna ibn Haris withdrew from central Iraq to the region near the Arabian desert to delay war until reinforcement came from Medina. Umar sent reinforcements under the command of Abu Ubayd al-Thaqafi. This army was defeated by the Sasanian army at the Battle of the Bridge in which Abu Ubaid was killed. The response was delayed until after a decisive Muslim victory against the Romans in the Levant at the Battle of Yarmouk in 636. Umar was then able to transfer forces to the east and resume the offensive against the Sasanians. Umar dispatched 36,000 men along with 7500 troops from the Syrian front, under the command of Sa`d ibn Abī Waqqās against the Persian army. The Battle of al-Qādisiyyah followed, with the Persians prevailing at first, but, on the third day of fighting, the Muslims gained the upper hand. The legendary Persian general Rostam Farrokhzād was killed during the battle. According to some sources, the Persian losses were 20,000, and the Arabs lost 10,500 men.

Following this Battle, the Arab Muslim armies pushed forward toward the Persian capital of Ctesiphon (also called Madā'in in Arabic), which was quickly evacuated by Yazdgird after a brief siege. After seizing the city, they continued their drive eastwards, following Yazdgird and his remaining troops. Within a short span of time, the Arab armies defeated a major Sasanian counter-attack in the Battle of Jalūlā', as well as other engagements at Qasr-e Shirin, and Masabadhan. By the mid-7th century, the Arabs controlled all of Mesopotamia, including the area that is now the Iranian province of Khuzestan. It is said that Caliph Umar did not wish to send his troops through the Zagros mountains and onto the Iranian plateau. One tradition has it that he wished for a "wall of fire" to keep the Arabs and Persians apart. Later commentators explain this as a common-sense precaution against over-extension of his forces. The Arabs had only recently conquered large territories that still had to be garrisoned and administered. The continued existence of the Persian government was, however, incitement to revolt in the conquered territories and unlike the Byzantine army, the Sasanian army was continuously striving to regain their lost territories. Finally, Umar pressed forward, which eventually resulted in the wholesale conquest of the Sasanian Empire. Yazdegerd, the Sasanian king, made yet another effort to regroup and defeat the invaders. By 641 he had raised a new force, which made a stand at the Battle of Nihawānd, some forty miles south of Hamadan in modern Iran. The Rashidun army, under the command of Umar's appointed general Nu'man ibn Muqarrin al-Muzani, attacked and again defeated the Persian forces. The Muslims proclaimed it the Victory of Victories (Fath alfotuh), as it marked the End of the Sasanians, shattering the last strongest Sasanian army.

Yazdegerd was unable to raise another army and became a hunted fugitive. In 642 Umar sent the army to conquer the remainder of the Persian Empire. The entirety of present-day Iran was conquered, followed by Greater Khorasan (which included the modern Iranian Khorasan province and modern Afghanistan), Transoxania, Balochistan and Makran (part of modern-day Pakistan), Azerbaijan, Dagestan (Russia), Armenia and Georgia; these regions were later re-conquered during Uthman's reign with further expansion into the regions which were not conquered during Umar's reign; hence, the Rashidun Caliphate's frontiers in the east extended to the lower river Indus and north to the Oxus River.

Wars against the Byzantine Empire

Conquest of Byzantine Syria

After Khalid consolidated his control of Iraq, Abu Bakr sent four armies to Syria on the Byzantine front under four different commanders: Abu Ubaidah ibn al-Jarrah (acting as their supreme commander), Amr ibn al-As, Yazid ibn Abu Sufyan and Shurhabil ibn Hasana. However, their advance was halted by a concentration of the Byzantine army at Ajnadayn. Abu Ubaidah then sent for reinforcements. Abu Bakr ordered Khalid, who by now was planning to attack Ctesiphon, to march from Iraq to Syria with half his army. There were 2 major routes to Syria from Iraq, one passing through Mesopotamia and the other through Daumat ul-Jandal. Khalid took an unconventional route through the Syrian Desert, and after a perilous march of 5 days, appeared in north-western Syria.

The border forts of Sawa, Arak, Tadmur, Sukhnah, al-Qaryatayn and Hawarin were the first to fall to the invading Muslims. Khalid marched on to Bosra via the Damascus road. At Bosra, the Corps of Abu Ubaidah and Shurhabil joined Khalid, upon which, per Abu Bakr's orders, Khalid assumed overall command from Abu Ubaidah. Bosra, caught unprepared, surrendered after a brief siege in July 634 (see Battle of Bosra), effectively ending the dynasty of the Ghassanids.

From Bosra, Khalid sent orders to the other corps commanders to join him at Ajnadayn, where, according to early Muslim historians, a Byzantine army of 90,000 (modern sources state 9,000) was concentrated to push back the Muslims. The Byzantine army was defeated decisively on 30 July 634 in the Battle of Ajnadayn. It was the first major pitched battle between the Muslims and Byzantines and cleared the way for the former to capture central Syria. Damascus, the Byzantine stronghold, was conquered shortly after on 19 September 634. The Byzantine army was given a deadline of 3 days to flee as far as they could, with their families and treasure, or simply agree to stay in Damascus and pay tribute. After the three days had passed, the Muslim cavalry, under Khalid's command, attacked the Roman army by catching up to them using an unknown shortcut at the battle of Maraj-al-Debaj.

On 22 August 634, Abu Bakr died, making Umar his successor. As Umar became caliph, he restored Abu Ubaidah ibn al-Jarrah to the overall command of the Muslim armies. The conquest of Syria slowed down under him while he relied heavily on the advice of Khalid, who he kept close at hand.

The last large garrison of the Byzantine army was at Fahl, which was joined by survivors of Ajnadayn. With this threat at their rear, the Muslim armies could not move further north nor south. Thus Abu Ubaidah decided to deal with the situation, and defeated and routed this garrison at the Battle of Fahl on 23 January 635, which proved to be the "Key to Palestine". After this battle Abu Ubaidah and Khalid marched north towards Emesa; Yazid was stationed in Damascus while Amr and Shurhabil marched south to capture Palestine.
While the Muslims were at Fahl, sensing the weak defense of Damascus, Emperor Heraclius sent an army to re-capture the city. This army, however, could not make it to Damascus and was intercepted by Abu Ubaidah and Khalid on their way to Emesa. The army was destroyed in the battle of Maraj-al-Rome and the second battle of Damascus. Emesa and the strategic town of Chalcis made peace with the Muslims for one year in order to buy time for Heraclius to prepare his defences and raise new armies. The Muslims welcomed the peace and consolidated their control over the conquered territory. However, as soon as the Muslims received the news of reinforcements being sent to Emesa and Chalcis, they marched against Emesa, laid siege to it and eventually captured the city in March 636.

The prisoners taken in the battle informed them about Emperor Heraclius's plans to take back Syria. They said that an army possibly 200,000 strong would soon emerge to recapture the province. Khalid stopped here on June 636. As soon as Abu Ubaida heard the news of the advancing Byzantine army, he gathered all his officers to plan their next move. Khalid suggested that they should consolidate all of their forces present in the province of Syria (Syria, Jordan, Palestine) and then move towards the plain of Yarmouk for battle.

Abu Ubaida ordered the Muslim commanders to withdraw from all the conquered areas, return the tributes they had previously gathered, and move towards Yarmuk. Heraclius's army also moved towards Yarmuk, but the Muslim armies reached it in early July 636, a week or two before the Byzantines. Khalid's mobile guard defeated the Christian Arab auxiliaries of the Roman army in a skirmish.

Nothing further happened until the third week of August, during which the Battle of Yarmouk was fought. The battle lasted 6 days during which Abu Ubaida transferred the command of the entire army to Khalid. Outnumbered five-to-one, the Muslims nevertheless defeated the Byzantine army in October 636. Abu Ubaida held a meeting with his high command officers, including Khalid, to decide on future conquests, settling on Jerusalem. The siege of Jerusalem lasted four months, after which the city agreed to surrender, but only to Caliph Umar Ibn Al Khattab in person. Amr ibn Al As suggested that Khalid should be sent as Caliph, because of his very strong resemblance to Caliph Umar.

Khalid was recognized and eventually, Caliph Umar ibn Al Khattab came and Jerusalem surrendered in April 637. Abu Ubaida sent Amr bin al-As, Yazid bin Abu Sufyan, and Sharjeel bin Hassana back to their areas to reconquer them; most submitted without a fight. Abu Ubaida himself, along with Khalid, moved to northern Syria to reconquer it with a 17,000-man army. Khalid, along with his cavalry, was sent to Hazir and Abu Ubaidah moved to the city of Qasreen.

Khalid defeated a strong Byzantine army at the Battle of Hazir and reached Qasreen before Abu Ubaidah. The city surrendered to Khalid, and soon after, Abu Ubaidah arrived in June 637. Abu Ubaidah then moved against Aleppo, with Khalid, as usual, commanding the cavalry. After the Battle of Aleppo the city finally agreed to surrender in October 637.

Occupation of Anatolia

Abu Ubaidah and Khalid ibn al-Walid, after conquering all of northern Syria, moved north towards Anatolia taking the fort of Azaz to clear the flank and rear of Byzantine troops. On their way to Antioch, a Roman army blocked them near a river on which there was an iron bridge. Because of this, the following battle is known as the Battle of the Iron Bridge. The Muslim army defeated the Byzantines and Antioch surrendered on 30 October 637 CE. Later during the year, Abu Ubaidah sent Khalid and Iyad ibn Ghanm at the head of two separate armies against the western part of Jazira, most of which was conquered without strong resistance, including parts of Anatolia, Edessa and the area up to the Ararat plain. Other columns were sent to Anatolia as far west as the Taurus Mountains, the important city of Marash, and Malatya, which were all conquered by Khalid in the autumn of 638 CE. During Uthman's reign, the Byzantines recaptured many forts in the region and on Uthman's orders, a series of campaigns were launched to regain control of them. In 647 Muawiyah, the governor of Syria, sent an expedition against Anatolia, invading Cappadocia and sacking Caesarea Mazaca. In 648 the Rashidun army raided Phrygia. A major offensive into Cilicia and Isauria in 650–651 forced the Byzantine Emperor Constans II to enter into negotiations with Muawiyah.
The truce that followed allowed a short respite and made it possible for Constans II to hold on to the western portions of Armenia. In 654–655, on the orders of Uthman, an expedition prepared to attack Constantinople, but this plan was not carried out due to the civil war that broke out in 656.

The Taurus Mountains in Turkey marked the western frontiers of the Rashidun Caliphate in Anatolia during Caliph Uthman's reign.

Conquest of Egypt

In 639, Egypt was a prefecture of the Byzantine Empire. However, it had been occupied just a decade before by the Sasanian Empire under Khosrau II (616 to 629 CE). The power of the Byzantine Empire was shattered during the Muslim conquest of Syria, and therefore the conquest of Egypt was much easier. In 639 some 4000 Rashidun troops led by Amr ibn al-As were sent by Umar to conquer the land of the ancient pharaohs. The Rashidun army crossed into Egypt from Palestine in December 639 and advanced rapidly into the Nile Delta. The imperial garrisons retreated into the walled towns, where they successfully held out for a year or more. However, the Muslims sent for reinforcements, and the invading army, joined by another 12,000 men in 640, defeated a Byzantine army at the Battle of Heliopolis. Amr next proceeded in the direction of Alexandria, which was surrendered to him by a treaty signed on 8 November 641. The Thebaid seems to have surrendered with scarcely any opposition.

The ease with which this valuable province was wrenched from the Byzantine Empire appears to have been due to the treachery of Cyrus, prefect of Egypt and Patriarch of Alexandria, and the incompetence of the Byzantine generals, as well as the loss of most of the Byzantine troops in Syria. Cyrus had persecuted the local Coptic Christians. He was one of the authors of monothelism, a seventh-century heresy, and some supposed him to have been a secret convert to Islam.

In 645, during Uthman's reign, the Byzantines briefly regained Alexandria, but it was retaken by Amr in 646. In 654 an invasion fleet sent by Constans II was repulsed. After this, no serious effort was made by the Byzantines to regain possession of the country.

The Muslims were assisted by some Copts, who found the Muslims more tolerant than the Byzantines, and of these, some turned to Islam. In return for a tribute of money and food for the occupation troops, the Christian inhabitants of Egypt were excused from military service and left free in the observance of their religion and the administration of their affairs. Others sided with the Byzantines, hoping that they would provide a defense against the Arab invaders. During the reign of Caliph Ali, Egypt was captured by rebel troops under the command of former Rashidun army general Amr ibn al-As, who killed Muhammad ibn Abi Bakr, the governor of Egypt appointed by Ali.

Conquest of North Africa

After the withdrawal of the Byzantines from Egypt, the Exarchate of Africa declared its independence. Under its exarch, Gregory the Patrician, its dominions extended from the borders of Egypt to Morocco. Abdullah ibn Sa'ad sent raiding parties to the west, resulting in considerable booty and encouraging Sa'ad to propose a campaign to conquer the Exarchate.

Uthman gave him permission after considering it in the Majlis al-Shura. A force of 10,000 soldiers was sent as reinforcement. The Rashidun army assembled in Barqa in Cyrenaica, and from there they marched west, captured Tripoli, and then advanced to Sufetula, Gregory's capital. In the ensuing battle, the Exarchate was defeated and Gregory was killed due to the superior tactics of Abdullah ibn Zubayr. Afterward, the people of North Africa sued for peace, agreeing to pay an annual tribute. Instead of annexing North Africa, the Muslims preferred to make North Africa a vassal state. When the stipulated amount of the tribute was paid, the Muslim forces withdrew to Barqa. Following the First Fitna, the first Islamic civil war, Muslim forces withdrew from north Africa to Egypt. The Umayyad Caliphate would later re-invade North Africa in 664.

Campaign against Nubia (Sudan)

A campaign was undertaken against Nubia during the Caliphate of Umar in 642, but failed after the Makurians won the First Battle of Dongola. The Muslim army pulled out of Nubia with nothing to show for it. Ten years later, Uthman's governor of Egypt, Abdullah ibn Saad, sent another army to Nubia. This army penetrated deeper into Nubia and laid siege to the Nubian capital of Dongola. The Muslims damaged the cathedral in the center of the city, but Makuria also won this battle. As the Muslims were unable to overpower Makuria, they negotiated a mutual non-aggression treaty with their king, Qaladurut. Each side also agreed to afford free passage to each other through their respective territories. Nubia agreed to provide 360 slaves to Egypt every year, while Egypt agreed to supply grain, horses, and textiles to Nubia according to demand.

Conquest of the islands of the Mediterranean Sea

During Umar's reign, the governor of Syria, Muawiyah I, sent a request to build a naval force to invade the islands of the Mediterranean Sea but Umar rejected the proposal because of the risk to the soldiers. Once Uthman became caliph, however, he approved Muawiyah's request. In 650, Muawiyah attacked Cyprus, conquering the capital, Constantia, after a brief siege, but signed a treaty with the local rulers. During this expedition, a relative of Muhammad, Umm-Haram, fell from her mule near the Salt Lake at Larnaca and was killed. She was buried in that same spot, which became a holy site for many local Muslims and Christians and, in 1816, the Hala Sultan Tekke was built there by the Ottomans. After apprehending a breach of the treaty, the Arabs re-invaded the island in 654 with five hundred ships. This time, however, a garrison of 12,000 men was left in Cyprus, bringing the island under Muslim influence. After leaving Cyprus, the Muslim fleet headed towards Crete and then Rhodes and conquered them without much resistance. From 652 to 654, the Muslims launched a naval campaign against Sicily and captured a large part of the island. Soon after this, Uthman was murdered, ending his expansionist policy, and the Muslims accordingly retreated from Sicily. In 655 Byzantine Emperor Constans II led a fleet in person to attack the Muslims at Phoinike (off Lycia) but it was defeated: both sides suffered heavy losses in the battle, and the emperor himself narrowly avoided death.

Treatment of conquered peoples

The non-Muslim monotheists—Jews, Zoroastrians, and Christians—in conquered lands were called dhimmis (the protected people). Those who accepted Islam were treated in a similar manner to other Muslims and were given equivalent rights in legal matters. Non-Muslims were given legal rights according to their faiths' law except where it conflicted with Islamic law.

Dhimmis were allowed to "practice their religion, and to enjoy a measure of communal autonomy" and were guaranteed their personal safety and security of property, but only in return for paying tax and acknowledging Muslim rule. Dhimmis were also required to pay the jizya.

The Rashidun caliphs had placed special emphasis on relatively fair and just treatment of the dhimmis, which were also provided 'protection' by the Caliphate and were not expected to fight. Sometimes, particularly when there were not enough qualified Muslims, dhimmis were given important positions in the government.

Political administration

The basic administrative system of the Dar al-Islamiyyah (The House of Islam) was laid down in the days of Muhammad. Caliph Abu Bakr stated in his sermon when he was elected: "If I order any thing that would go against the order of Allah and his Messenger; then do not obey me". This is considered to be the foundation stone of the Caliphate.
Caliph Umar has been reported to have said: "O Muslims, straighten me with your hands when I go wrong", and at that instance, a Muslim man stood up and said, "O Amir al-Mu'minin (Leader of the Believers) if you are not straightened by our hands we will use our sword to straighten you!". Hearing this Caliph Umar said "Alhamdulillah (Praise be to Allah) I have such followers."

Districts or provinces
Under Abu Bakr, the empire was not clearly divided into provinces, though it had many administrative districts.

Under Umar the Empire was divided into a number of provinces which were as follows:
 Arabia was divided into two provinces, Mecca and Medina.
 Iraq was divided into two provinces, Basra and Kufa.
 Jazira was divided into two provinces, the Tigris and the Euphrates.
 Syria was a province.
 Palestine was divided in two provinces: Aylya and Ramlah.
 Egypt was divided into two provinces: Upper Egypt and Lower Egypt.
 Persia was divided into three provinces: Khorasan, Azerbaijan, and Fars.

In his testament Umar had instructed his successor, Uthman, not to make any change in the administrative setup for one year after his death, which Uthman honored; however, after the expiration of the moratorium, he made Egypt one province and created a new province comprising North Africa. He also consolidated Syria, previously divided into two provinces, into one.

During Uthman's reign the caliphate was divided into twelve provinces. These were:
 Medina
 Mecca
 Yemen
 Kufa
 Basra
 Jazira
 Fars
 Azerbaijan
 Khorasan
 Syria
 Egypt
 Maghreb

During Ali's reign, with the exception of Syria (which was under Muawiyah I's control) and Egypt (lost during the latter years of his caliphate to the rebel troops of Amr ibn Al-A'as), the remaining ten provinces were under his control, with no change in administrative organization.

The provinces were further divided into districts. Each of the 100 or more districts of the empire, along with the main cities, were administered by a governor (Wāli). Other officers at the provincial level were:
 Katib, the Chief Secretary.
 Katib-ud-Diwan, the Military Secretary.
 Sahib-ul-Kharaj, the Revenue Collector.
 Sahib-ul-Ahdath, the Police chief.
 Sahib-ul-Bait-ul-Mal, the Treasury Officer.
 Qadi, the Chief Judge.

In some districts there were separate military officers, though the governor was in most cases the commander-in-chief of the army quartered in the province.

The officers were appointed by the Caliph. Every appointment was made in writing. At the time of appointment, an instrument of instructions was issued to regulate the conduct of the governors. On assuming office, the Governor was required to assemble the people in the main mosque, and read the instrument of instructions before them.

Umar's general instructions to his officers were:

During the reign of Abu Bakr the state was economically weak, while during Umar's reign because of an increase in revenues and other sources of income, the state was on its way to economic prosperity. Hence Umar felt it necessary to treat the officers strictly, in order to prevent corruption. During his reign, at the time of appointment, every officer was required to swear an oath:
 That he would not ride a Turkic horse (which was a symbol of pride).
 That he would not wear fine clothes.
 That he would not eat sifted flour.
 That he would not keep a porter at his door.
 That he would always keep his door open to the public.

Caliph Umar himself followed the above postulates strictly. During the reign of Uthman the state became more economically prosperous than ever before; the allowance of the citizens was increased by 25%, and the economic condition of the ordinary person was more stable, which led Caliph Uthman to revoke the second and third postulates of the oath.

At the time of an officer's appointment, a complete inventory of all his possessions was prepared and kept on record. If there was later an unusual increase in his possessions, he was immediately called to account, and the unlawful property confiscated by the State. The principal officers were required to come to Mecca on the occasion of the Hajj, during which people were free to present any complaint against them. In order to minimize the chances of corruption, Umar made it a point to pay high salaries to the staff. Provincial governors received as much as five to seven thousand dirhams annually besides their share of the spoils of war (if they were also the commander-in-chief of the army of their sector).

Judicial administration
The judicial administration, like the rest of the administrative structure of the Rashidun Caliphate, was set up by Umar, and it remained basically unchanged throughout the duration of the Caliphate. In order to provide adequate and speedy justice for the people, justice was administered according to the principles of Islam.

Accordingly, Qadis (judges) were appointed at all administrative levels. The Qadis were chosen for their integrity and learning in Islamic law. Wealthy men and men of high social status, compensated highly by the Caliphate, were appointed in order to make them resistant to bribery or undue influence based on social position. The Qadis also were not allowed to engage in trade. Judges were appointed in sufficient numbers to staff every district with at least one.

Electing or appointing a caliph
The four Rashidun caliphs were chosen by a small electoral body consisting of prominent members of the Quraysh called .

Fred Donner, in his book The Early Islamic Conquests (1981), argues that the standard Arabian practice during the early Caliphates was for the prominent men of a kinship group, or tribe, to gather after a leader's death and elect a leader from amongst themselves, although there was no specified procedure for this shura, or consultative assembly. Candidates were usually from the same lineage as the deceased leader, but they were not necessarily his sons. Capable men who would lead well were preferred over an ineffectual direct heir, as there was no basis in the majority Sunni view that the head of state or governor should be chosen based on lineage alone.

This argument is advanced by Sunni Muslims that Muhammad's companion Abu Bakr was elected by the community, and this was the proper procedure. They further argue that a caliph is ideally chosen by election or community consensus. The caliphate became a hereditary office or the prize of the strongest general after the Rashidun caliphate. However, Sunni Muslims believe this was after the 'rightly guided' Rashidun caliphate ended.

Abu Bakr Al-Baqillani has said that the leader of the Muslims should simply be from the majority. Abu Hanifa an-Nu‘man also wrote that the leader must come from the majority.

Sunni belief
Following the death of Muhammad, a meeting took place at Saqifah. At that meeting, Abu Bakr was elected caliph by the Muslim community. Sunni Muslims developed the belief that the caliph is a temporal political ruler, appointed to rule within the bounds of Islamic law (viz., the rules of life set by Allah in the Qur'an). The job of adjudicating orthodoxy and Islamic law was left to Islamic lawyers, judiciary, or specialists individually termed as Mujtahids and collectively named the Ulema. The first four caliphs are called the Rashidun, meaning the Rightly Guided Caliphs, because they are believed to have followed the Qur'an and the sunnah (example) of Muhammad in all things.

Accountability of rulers

Sunni Islamic lawyers have commented on when it is permissible to disobey, impeach or remove rulers in the Caliphate. This is usually when the rulers are not meeting public responsibilities obliged upon them under Islam.

Al-Mawardi said that if the rulers meet their Islamic responsibilities to the public, the people must obey their laws, but if they become either unjust or severely ineffective then the Caliph or ruler must be impeached via the Majlis al-Shura. Al-Juwayni argued that Islam is the goal of the ummah, so any ruler that deviates from this goal must be impeached. Al-Ghazali believed that oppression by a caliph is enough for impeachment. Rather than just relying on impeachment, Ibn Hajar al-Asqalani obliged rebellion upon the people if the caliph began to act with no regard for Islamic law. Ibn Hajar al-Asqalani said that to ignore such a situation is haraam, and those who cannot revolt inside the caliphate should launch a struggle from outside. Al-Asqalani used two ayahs from the Qur'an to justify this:

Islamic lawyers have commented that when the rulers refuse to step down via successful impeachment through the Majlis, becoming dictators through the support of a corrupt army, the majority, upon agreement, has the option to launch a revolution against them. Many noted that this option is only exercised after factoring in the potential cost of life.

Rule of law

The following hadith establishes the principle of rule of law in relation to nepotism and accountability:

Various Islamic lawyers do, however, place multiple conditions, and stipulations—e.g., the poor cannot be penalised for stealing out of poverty—before executing such a law, making it very difficult to reach such a stage. It is well known that, during a time of drought during the Rashidun caliphate, capital punishments were suspended until the effects of the drought passed.

Islamic jurists later formulated the concept of the rule of law, the equal subjection of all classes to the ordinary law of the land. A Qadi (Islamic judge) was also not allowed to discriminate on the grounds of religion, gender, colour, kinship or prejudice. There were also a number of cases where caliphs had to appear before judges as they prepared to deliver their verdict.

According to Noah Feldman, a law professor at Harvard University, the legal scholars and jurists who once upheld the rule of law were replaced by a law governed by the state due to the codification of Sharia by the Ottoman Empire in the early 19th century.

Economy

Bait-ul-Maal

Bait-ul-Maal (lit., the house of money) was the department that dealt with the revenues and all other economic matters of the state. In the time of Muhammad, there was no permanent Bait-ul-Mal or public treasury. Whatever revenues or other amounts were received were distributed immediately. There were no salaries to be paid, and there was no state expenditure, thereby making a public treasury unnecessary.

Abu Bakr (632–634) established a house where all money was kept on receipt. As all money was distributed immediately, the treasury generally remained locked up; at the time of Abu Bakr's death, there was only one dirham in the public treasury.

Establishment of Bait-ul-Maal

In the time of Umar, things changed. With each conquest, revenue increased. Umar also granted salaries to the army. Abu Huraira, the Governor of Bahrain, sent his revenue to Umar, amounting to five hundred thousand dirhams. Umar summoned a meeting of his Consultative Assembly and sought the opinion of the Companions about the disposal of the money. Uthman ibn Affan advised that the amount should be kept for future needs. Walid bin Hisham suggested that, like the Byzantines, separate departments of treasury and accounts should be set up.

After consulting the Companions, Umar decided to establish the central Treasury at Medina. Abdullah bin Arqam was appointed as the Treasury Officer. He was assisted by Abdur Rahman bin Awf and Muiqib. A separate Accounts Department was also set up to maintain spending records.
Later treasuries were set up in the provinces. After meeting the local expenditure the provincial treasuries were required to remit the surplus revenue to the central treasury at Medina. According to Yaqubi the salaries and stipends charged to the central treasury amounted to over 30 million dirhams.

A separate building was constructed for the royal treasury, the bait ul maal, which, in large cities, was protected by as many as 400 guards.

Most historical accounts state that, among the Rashidun caliphs, Uthman was the first to strike coins; some accounts, however, state that Umar was the first to do so. When Persia was conquered, three types of coins were current there: the Baghli, of eight dang; Tabari of four dang; and Maghribi of three dang. Umar (or Uthman, according to some accounts) first struck an Islamic dirham of six dang.

Social welfare and pensions were introduced in early Islamic law as forms of zakāt (charity), one of the Five Pillars of Islam, since the time of Umar. The taxes (including zakāt and jizya) collected in the treasury of an Islamic government were used to provide income for the needy, including the poor, elderly, orphans, widows, and the disabled. According to the Islamic jurist Al-Ghazali (Algazel, 1058–1111), the government was also expected to stockpile food supplies in every region in case a disaster or famine occurred. The Caliphate was thus one of the earliest welfare states.

Economic resources of the State
The economic resources of the State were:
 Zakāt
 Ushr
 Jizya
 Fay
 Khums
 Kharaj

Zakat

Zakāt is the Islamic equivalent of a luxury tax. It was taken from the Muslims in the amount of 2.5% of their dormant wealth (viz., that over a certain amount unused for a year) to give to the poor. All and only those persons whose annual wealth exceeded a minimum level (nisab) were collected from. The nisab did not include one's primary residence, primary transportation, a moderate amount of woven jewelry, etc. Zakāt is one of the Five Pillars of Islam.

Jizya

Jizya or jizyah (Ottoman Turkish: cizye). It was a per capita tax imposed on able bodied non-Muslim men of military age since non-Muslims did not have to pay zakāt. Slaves, women, children, monks, the old, the sick, hermits and the poor were all exempt. It is important to note that, in addition to the exemptions, some needy non-Muslims were given stipends by the state.

Fay
Fay was the income from State land, whether an agricultural land or a meadow or land with any natural mineral reserves.

Khums

Ghanimah or Khums represented war booty, four-fifths of which was distributed among serving soldiers, while one-fifth was allotted to the state.

Kharaj

Kharaj was a tax on agricultural land.

Initially, after the first Muslim conquests in the seventh century, kharaj usually denoted a lump-sum duty levied upon the conquered provinces and collected by the officials of the former Byzantine and Sasanian empires, or, more broadly, any kind of tax levied by Muslim conquerors on their non-Muslim subjects, dhimmis. At that time, kharaj was synonymous with jizyah, which later emerged as a poll tax paid by dhimmis. Muslim landowners, on the other hand, paid only ushr, a religious tithe, which carried a much lower rate of taxation.

Ushr
Ushr was a reciprocal 10% levy on agricultural land as well as merchandise imported from states that taxed the Muslims on their products. Umar was the first Muslim ruler to levy ushr. Umar issued instructions that ushr should be levied in such a way so as to avoid hardship, so as not to affect trade within the Caliphate. The tax was levied only on merchandise meant for sale; goods imported for consumption or personal use but not for sale were not taxed. Merchandise valued at 200 dirhams or less was not taxed. Imports by citizens for trade purposes were subject to the customs duty or import tax at lower rates. In the case of the dhimmis, the rate was 5% and, in the case of the Muslims, 2.5%, the same as that of zakāt. The levy was thus regarded as a part of zakāt rather than a separate tax.

Allowance

Beginning of the allowance
After the Battle of Yarmouk and Battle of al-Qadisiyyah the Muslims won heavy spoils, filling the coffers at Medina. The problem before Umar was what to do with this money. Someone suggested that the money should be kept in the treasury as a reserve for public expenditures. However, this view was not acceptable to the general body of Muslims. Accordingly, a consensus was reached to distribute whatever was received during a year to the citizens.

The next question was what system should be adopted for distribution. One suggestion was to distribute it equally on an ad hoc basis. Others objected that, as the spoils were considerable, the proposal would make the people very rich. It was therefore agreed that, instead of ad hoc division, the amount of the allowance to the stipend should be determined beforehand and this allowance should be paid regardless of the amount of the spoils.

On the amount of the allowance there were two opinions. Some held that it should be the same for all Muslims. Umar, on the other hand, believed that the allowance should be graduated according to one's merit with reference to Islam.

Then the question arose as to what basis should be used for placing some above others. Some suggested that the Caliph should first get the highest allowance, with the remaining allowances graduating downward from that. Umar rejected the proposal and decided to start with the clan of Muhammad.

Umar set up a committee to compile a list of persons by nearness to Muhammad. The committee produced the list clan-wise. Bani Hashim appeared as the first clan, then the clan of Abu Bakr, and then the clan of Umar. Umar accepted the first two placements but relegated his clan lower on the relationship scale.

The main provisions of the final scale of allowance approved by Umar were:

 The widows of Muhammad received 12,000 dirhams each;
 `Abbas ibn `Abd al-Muttalib, the uncle of Muhammad, received an annual allowance of 7,000 dirhams;
 The grandsons of Muhammad, Hasan ibn Ali and Hussain ibn Ali received 5,000 dirhams each;
 The veterans of the Battle of Badr got an allowance of 6,000 dirhams each;
 Those who had become Muslims by the time of the Treaty of Hudaybiyyah got 4,000 dirhams each;
 Those who became Muslims at the time of the Conquest of Mecca received 3,000 dirhams each;
 The veterans of the Apostasy wars received 3,000 dirhams each.
 The veterans of the Battle of Yarmouk and the Battle of al-Qadisiyyah received 2,000 dirhams each.

Under this scale, Umar's son Abdullah ibn Umar received an allowance of 3,000 dirhams, while Usama ibn Zaid got 4,000. The ordinary Muslim citizens were given allowances of between 2,000 and 2,500. The regular annual allowance was given only to the urban population because they formed the backbone of the state's economic resources. The Bedouin living in the desert, cut off from the state's affairs, and making no contributions to development, were nevertheless often given stipends. On assuming office, Uthman increased these stipends by 25%.

Evaluation
The evaluation greatly contributed to the prosperity of the citizens as trade increased, and their contributions to the bait al maal increased accordingly.

Public works
The mosques were not merely places for offering prayers, but also community centers where the faithful gathered to discuss problems of social and cultural importance. During the caliphate of Umar, as many as four thousand mosques were constructed extending from Persia in the east to Egypt in the west. Al-Masjid an-Nabawi and Masjid al-Haram were enlarged first during the reign of Umar and then during the reign of Uthman ibn Affan, who not only expanded them but also beautified them on a large scale.

During the caliphate of Umar, many new cities were founded. These included Kufa, Basra, and Fustat. These cities were laid out according to the principles of urban planning. All streets in these cities led to the Friday mosque, which was sited in the center of the city. Markets were established at convenient points, which were overseen by market officers charged with ensuring the quality of goods. The cities were divided into quarters, and each quarter was reserved for particular tribes. During the reign of Umar, there were restrictions on the construction of palatial buildings by the rich and elites—symbolic of the egalitarian society of Islam, where all were equal—although the restrictions were later revoked by Uthman because of the rise in the overall standard of living, and the construction of two-story buildings were permitted. As a result, many palatial buildings were constructed throughout the empire, including Uthman's huge palace in Medina, Al-Zawar, constructed from his personal resources.

Many buildings were built for administrative purposes. In the Dar-ul-Amarat quarters, government offices and residences for officers were sited. Diwans were constructed to house official records. Bait-ul-Mal was used to house royal treasuries. Jails were constructed for the first time in Muslim history. In important cities, guest houses were constructed to serve traders and merchants coming from faraway places. Roads and bridges were constructed for public use. On the road from Medina to Mecca, shelters, wells, and meal houses were constructed at every stage for the convenience of the people who came for hajj.

Military cantonments were constructed at strategic points. Special stables were provided for cavalry, which could accommodate as many as 4,000 horses. Special pasture grounds were provided and maintained for Bait-ul-Mal animals.

Canals were dug to irrigate fields as well as provide drinking water. The Abu Musa canal, named for the governor of Basra, was a nine-mile (14 km) long canal which brought water from the Tigris to Basra. The Maqal canal was also dug from the Tigris. The Amir al-Mu'minin canal, named for a title created by Umar, was dug to join the Nile to the Red Sea. During the famine of 639, grain was brought from Egypt to Arabia through this canal, which saved the lives of millions. The Sa`d ibn Abi Waqqas canal, named for the governor of Kufa, brought water to Anbar from the Euphrates. 'Amr ibn al-'As, the governor of Egypt during the reign of Umar, even proposed the digging of a canal to join the Mediterranean to the Red Sea. This proposal, however, did not materialize due to unknown reasons, and it was 1200 years later that such a canal was dug—the modern Suez Canal. Shuaibia was the port for Mecca, but it was inconvenient, so Uthman had a new seaport built at Jeddah. Uthman also reformed the city's police departments.

Legacy 

Some secular scholars have questioned the traditional Sunni view of the Rashidun. Robert G. Hoyland states that "writers who lived at the same time as the first four caliphs ... recorded next to nothing about them, and their names do not appear on coins, inscriptions, or documents. It is only with the fifth caliph", Muawiyah I (661–680), "that was have evidence of a functioning Arab government, since his name appears on all official state media." However, there do exist inscriptions dating to the period, one of which for instance mentions Umar by name and the date of his death, and there were also coins struck during his rule (although as Hoyland notes, they do not bear his name, simply "In the name of God,")

Hoyland also questions the alleged moral superiority of the Rashidun (or at least of Uthman and Ali) to their Umayyad successors, noting Ali was involved in the first civil war (First Fitna) and Uthman had "already inaugurated a nepotistic style of government", for which later Caliphs were condemned, and wonders if the idea of a divinely guided "golden age" of early Islam came from a need by late Umayyad and Abbasid religious scholars to differentiate the first caliphs (who had more power in law making) and the contemporary Caliphs who they wanted to defer to them (the ulama) in religious matters. Consequently, the companions were "given a makeover" as "model's of piety and beyond reproach".

This is in-line with Shi'ite views of the companions, including the Rashidun Caliphs. Many of the Shi'a do not share the Sunni view that the companions were all models of piety, instead accusing many them of conspiring after the Prophet's death to dispossess Ali ibn Abi Talib and his descendants of the divinely ordained right to leadership. In this Shi'ite perspective, many of the companions and their successors were usurpers, even hypocrites, who never ceased to subvert the religion for their own interests.

The stark differences in these two views has led to sectarian tension that has even culminated in violence.

Military
The Rashidun Military was the primary arm of the Islamic armed forces of the seventh century, serving alongside the Rashidun navy. The army maintained a very high level of discipline, strategic prowess, and organization, along with the motivation and initiative of the officer corps. For much of its history, this army was one of the most powerful and effective military forces throughout the region. At the height of the Rashidun Caliphate, the maximum size of the army was around 100,000 troops.

Rashidun army 

The Rashidun army was divided into infantry and light cavalry. Reconstructing the military equipment of early Muslim armies is problematic. Compared with Roman armies or later medieval Muslim armies, the range of visual representation is very small, often imprecise. Physically, very little material evidence has survived, and much of it is difficult to date. The soldiers wore iron and bronze segmented helmets from Iraq, of Central Asian type.

The standard form of body armor was chainmail. There are also references to the practice of wearing two coats of mail (dir’ayn), the one under the main one being shorter or even made of fabric or leather. Hauberks and large wooden or wickerwork shields were also used as protection in combat. The soldiers were usually equipped with swords hung in a baldric. They also possessed spears and daggers. Umar was the first Muslim ruler to organize the army as a state department, in 637. A beginning was made with the Quraish and the Ansar and the system was gradually extended to the whole of Arabia and to Muslims of conquered lands.

The basic strategy of early Muslim armies on the campaign was to exploit every possible weakness of the enemy. Their key strength was mobility. The cavalry had both horses and camels, the latter used as both transport and food for long marches through the desert (e.g., Khalid ibn al-Walid's extraordinary march from the Persian border to Damascus). The cavalry was the army's main strike force and also served as a strategic mobile reserve. The common tactic was to use the infantry and archers to engage and maintain contact with the enemy while the cavalry was held back till the enemy was fully engaged. Once fully engaged, the enemy reserves were held by the infantry and archers, while the cavalry executed a pincer movement (like modern tank and mechanized divisions) to attack the enemy from the sides or to assault their base camps.

The Rashidun army was, in quality and strength, below the standard set by the Sasanian and Byzantine armies. Khalid ibn al-Walid was the first general of the Rashidun Caliphate to successfully conquer foreign lands. During his campaign against the Sasanian Empire (Iraq, 633–634) and the Byzantine Empire (Syria, 634–638), Khalid developed brilliant tactics that he used effectively against both enemy armies.

Abu Bakr's strategy was to give his generals their mission, the geographical area in which that mission would be carried out, and resources for that purpose. He would then leave it to his generals to accomplish their missions in whatever manner they chose. On the other hand, Umar, in the latter part of his Caliphate, adopted a more hands-on approach, directing his generals where to stay and when to move to the next target and who was to command the left and right-wing of the army in each particular battle. This made conquests comparatively slower but made the campaigns well-organized. Uthman and Ali reverted to Abu Bakr's method, giving missions to their generals and leaving the details to them.

Rashidun navy 

The early caliphate naval conquest managed to mark long time legacy of Islamic maritime enterprises from the Conquest of Cyprus, the famous Battle of the Masts up to of their successor states such as the area Transoxiana from area located in between the Jihun River(Oxus/Amu Darya) and Syr Darya, to Sindh (present day Pakistan), by Umayyad, naval cove of privateer in La Garde-Freinet by Cordoban Emirate, and the Sack of Rome by the Aghlabids in later era

List of Rashidun caliphs

See also

References

Citations

Sources

 
 
 
 
 
 
 
 
 
 
 
 
 
 
 

 
Caliphates
Former countries in Western Asia
Countries in medieval Africa
7th-century Islam
Early Muslim conquests
History of Central Asia
History of Saudi Arabia
7th century in Egypt
Medieval Iraq
Medieval Israel
Medieval Jordan
Medieval Palestine
7th century in Iran
Medieval Syria
Muslim conquest of Egypt
States and territories established in the 630s
States and territories disestablished in the 7th century
632 establishments
661 disestablishments
7th-century disestablishments in Africa
Historical transcontinental empires
7th-century disestablishments in Asia